Yangory is a rural locality (a settlement) in Undozerskoye Urban Settlement of Plesetsky District, Arkhangelsk Oblast, Russia. The population was 331 as of 2010.

Geography 
Yangory is located between Puga and Chyornaya Rivers, 143 km west of Plesetsk (the district's administrative centre) by road. Undozero is the nearest rural locality.

References 

Rural localities in Plesetsky District